Hilton is a village in Monroe County, New York, United States. The population was 5,886 at the 2010 census. The community was named for the Rev. Charles A. Hilton.
 
The Village of Hilton is within the Town of Parma.

History
In 1805, Jonathon Underwood came from Vermont and was the first to settle in the area now known as Hilton. Originally known as Unionville, the village was incorporated in 1885 as North Parma. In 1896, the name was changed to Hilton to honor Reverend Charles Augustus Hilton, a former pastor of the village's Freewill Baptist Church. Over 60% of the central business district was destroyed by fire in March 1965 and later rebuilt.

The Chase Cobblestone Farmhouse and Curtis-Crumb Farm are listed on the National Register of Historic Places.

Annual events 
 The entire community celebrates its apple growing heritage each fall with a two-day Apple Festival. Attractions include crafts, clowns, a large car show, and many different types of food.
 In mid-June, Hilton holds its annual Garage Sale weekend. Over 100 garage sales.
 In mid-July, Hilton holds its annual fireman's carnival with rides, food and excitement for all ages.
 In the fall, Hilton is home to a corn maze which is one of the largest in the country at 20 acres. The maze has been run by Zarpentine Farms since 2001 and has thousands of guests from mid-September to the end of October.
 Hilton hosts an annual Make-A-Difference-Day that incorporates students and community members in working throughout the community, including building raised gardens for its older population, running a blood drive in conjunction with the American Red Cross, and collecting electronics for proper recycling.

Geography
Hilton is located at  (43.289873, -77.792444).

Demographics

As of the census of 2000, there were 5,856 people, 2,041 households, and 1,512 families residing in the village. The population density was 3,494.2 people per square mile (1,345.8/km2). There were 2,128 housing units at an average density of 1,269.7 per square mile (489.1/km2). The racial makeup of the village was 96.70% White, 1.66% African American, 0.14% Native American, 0.56% Asian, 0.19% from other races, and 0.75% from two or more races. Hispanic or Latino of any race were 1.49% of the population.

There were 2,041 households, out of which 44.7% had children under the age of 18 living with them, 57.7% were married couples living together, 11.6% had a female householder with no husband present, and 25.9% were non-families. 21.2% of all households were made up of individuals, and 7.6% had someone living alone who was 65 years of age or older. The average household size was 2.80 and the average family size was 3.29.

In the village, the population was spread out, with 31.3% under the age of 18, 7.2% from 18 to 24, 33.0% from 25 to 44, 18.6% from 45 to 64, and 10.0% who were 65 years of age or older. The median age was 34 years. For every 100 females, there were 92.3 males. For every 100 females age 18 and over, there were 86.9 males.

The median income for a household in the village was $51,336, and the median income for a family was $57,440. Males had a median income of $44,779 versus $27,192 for females. The per capita income for the village was $20,057. About 2.1% of families and 4.4% of the population were below the poverty line, including 3.1% of those under age 18 and 10.3% of those age 65 or over.

Education

Hilton is served by the Hilton Central School District

Notable people
Olympic Speed Skater Cathy Turner is from Hilton. Though native to Greece, NY, Ryan Callahan, a hockey player for the Tampa Bay Lightning and Silver Medal Olympian, attended public school in Hilton through ninth grade before leaving to play junior hockey in Canada. Callahan  received a diploma from Hilton High School.

References

External links
Village of Hilton, NY
Hilton History
Hilton-Parma-Hamlin Chamber of Commerce

Villages in New York (state)
Rochester metropolitan area, New York
Villages in Monroe County, New York